Sunbeam is a German electronic music project. The band consists of Florian Preis (born 1972 in Bensheim) and Michael Gerlach (born 1973 in Tehran). Since 1992 they have made progressive dance/trance-productions and remixes.

Their biggest hit "Outside World" (1994) is a hard trance track containing two vocal samples from the anime film Akira ("You know we aren't meant to exist in the outside world" and "I came to get you").

Discography

1994 
 E.P. of High Adventure (CD)
 Outside World E.P. (vinyl/single)
 Outside World (Mixes) (vinyl/single)
 Sunbeam EP (vinyl in Italy)

1995 
 Love is Paradise (vinyl/single)
 Out of Reality (CD/album - USA only)

1996 
 Arms Of Heaven (vinyl/single)

1997 
 Dreams (vinyl/single)
 Out of Reality (US-album)

1998 
 Lost In Music (promo-vinyl)

1999 
 Outside World (vinyl/single)

2000 
 Versus (Tomcraft vs. Sunbeam) (vinyl/single)
 Wake Up (vinyl/single)

2001 
 Do It (vinyl/single)
 One Minute In Heaven (vinyl/single)
 Lightyears (album)

2003 
 Watching the Stars (vinyl)

2004 
 Low Gravity (vinyl)

2019 
 Outside World (with Le Shuuk)

References

External links 
 Official Website
 
 Artist-Site Kontor Records

German trance music groups
Musical groups established in 1992